Lavan may refer to:

Places
 Lavan Island, Iran 
 Lavan Airport
 Lavan Rural District, Iran

Other uses
 Lavan (name)
 Lavan or Laban (Bible), a person in the Book of Genesis

See also
 ha-Lavan
 Lavans (disambiguation)